Frederick Goldie (1 September 1914 – 23 October 1980) was a Scottish Anglican bishop.

Early life and education
Goldie was born in Glasgow, Scotland, on 1 September 1914, the son of John and Maria Goldie. He was educated at Hatfield College, Durham, from where he earned his Bachelor of Arts degree and a Licentiate of Theology in 1938 and a Master of Arts in 1946. He also studied at the Edinburgh Theological College between 1934 and 1938. He then studied at the New College, Edinburgh of the University of Edinburgh, from where he graduated with a Bachelor of Divinity in 1939.

Ordained ministry
Goldie was ordained deacon in 1938 and priest in 1939 by the Bishop of Glasgow and Galloway. He served as a curate at the Good Shepherd Church in Hillington between 1938 and 1946, after which he became rector of the same church, remaining there until 1949. Between 1944 and 1946, he also served as priest-in-charge of Ascension Church in Glasgow. In 1949, he was appointed rector of St Augustine's Church in Dumbarton. He was a lecturer at the Edinburgh Theological College from 1940 until 1963. In 1963, he became Dean of Glasgow and Galloway, and subsequently rector of St Margaret's Church, until 1974.

Bishop
In 1974, he was elected Bishop of Glasgow and Galloway and was consecrated on 22 November 1974 at St Mary's Cathedral, Glasgow.

A noted ecclesiastical historian, he died in post.

References

1914 births
Alumni of Hatfield College, Durham
Alumni of New College, Edinburgh
Alumni of Edinburgh Theological College
Alumni of the University of Edinburgh
Deans of Glasgow and Galloway
Bishops of Glasgow and Galloway
20th-century Scottish Episcopalian bishops
1980 deaths